Haymer Lionel Flieg (January 19, 1920 – November 18, 1989), known professionally as Johnny Haymer, was an American actor known for his role as Staff Sergeant Zelmo Zale, a recurring character in the television series M*A*S*H. He appeared in a 1965 episode of The Cara Williams Show and was an announcer for the game show Your Number's Up hosted by Nipsey Russell; in the mid-1980s he provided his voice for the characters Swindle, Vortex, Highbrow, and Caliburst in The Transformers. He played Walter Pinkerton from 1982 to 1983 on Madame's Place and appeared in the penultimate episode of the original Star Trek series, "All Our Yesterdays".

Haymer additionally made brief television appearances in other popular series, including The Incredible Hulk Season 2 episode fourteen "Haunted", a police officer on The Facts of Life episode "Under Pressure" in 1983, and as a commissioner on The Golden Girls episode "It's a Miserable Life" in 1986.

Haymer appeared in television commercials for Standard Shoes stores during the 1980s.

Personal life

Haymer was born Haymer Lionel Flieg in St. Louis, Missouri, the son of Jewish immigrants. He graduated from the University of Missouri in 1942, majoring in speech and specializing in dramatic impressions. He died in Los Angeles, of cancer on November 18, 1989, aged 69.

Filmography

References

External links

 
 
 

1920 births
1989 deaths
American male film actors
American male television actors
American male voice actors
Game show announcers
Jewish American male actors
Male actors from St. Louis
Deaths from cancer in California
20th-century American male actors
20th-century American Jews